The 8th Cinemalaya Independent Film Festival was held from July 20 until 29, 2012 in Metro Manila, Philippines.

The awards night was held at the Tanghalang Nicanor Abelardo (Main Theater) of the Cultural Center of the Philippines.

Entries
The fifteen feature-film entries are divided into two separate competitions. The five feature-film entries will compete under the Directors Showcase which are presented by veteran film directors of the country. While the other ten feature-film entries will compete under the New Breed section which are presented by first-time or young filmmakers working today. The Short Film section has also ten competing entries. The winning film is highlighted with boldface and a dagger.

Directors Showcase

New Breed

Short films

Awards

Full-Length Features
Directors Showcase
 Best Film - Posas by Lawrence Fajardo
 Special Jury Prize - Kamera Obskura by Raymond Red
 Audience Award - Bwakaw by Jun Lana
 Best Direction - Raymond Red for Kamera Obskura
 Best Actor - Eddie Garcia for Bwakaw
 Best Actress / Supporting Actress - Judy Ann Santos, Iza Calzado, Agot Isidro and Janice de Belen for Mga Mumunting Lihim
 Best Supporting Actor - Arthur Acuña for Posas
 Best Screenplay - Jose Javier Reyes for Mga Mumunting Lihim
 Best Cinematography - Albert Banzon for Kalayaan
 Best Editing - Vanessa De Leon for Mga Mumunting Lihim
 Best Sound - Ditoy Aguila for Kalayaan
 Best Original Music Score - Diwa de Leon for Kamera Obskura
 Best Production Design - Adolfo Alix Jr. for Kalayaan

New Breed
 Best Film - Diablo by Mes de Guzman
 Special Jury Prize - REquieme! by Loy Arcenas
 Audience Award - Ang Nawawala by Marie Jamora
 Best Direction - Mes de Guzman for Diablo
 Best Actor - Kristoffer King for Oros
 Best Actress - Ama Quiambao for Diablo
 Best Supporting Actor - Joross Gamboa for Intoy Siyokoy ng Kalye Marino
 Best Supporting Actress - Anita Linda for Sta. Niña
 Best Screenplay - Rody Vera for REquieme!
 Best Cinematography - Tristan Salas for Diablo 
 Best Editing - Rona Delos Reyes, John Anthony L. Wong for The Animals
 Best Sound - Albert Michael Idioma for Aparisyon
 Best Original Music Score - Mikey Amistoso, Diego Mapa, Jazz Nicholas for Ang Nawawala 
 Best Production Design - Ben Payumo for Intoy Siyokoy ng Kalye Marino

Special Awards
 NETPAC Award 
 Directors Showcase - Bwakaw by Jun Lana
 New Breed - Diablo by Mes de Guzman

Short films
 Best Short Film - Victor by Jarell Serencio
 Special Jury Prize - Manenaya by Richard Legaspi
 Audience Award - Ruweda by Hannah Espia
 Best Direction - Sheron Dayoc for Mientras su Durmida
 Best Screenplay - Sigrid Andrea Bernardo for Ang Paghihintay sa Bulong

References

External links
Cinemalaya Independent Film Festival

Cinemalaya Independent Film Festival
Cine
Cine
2012 in Philippine cinema